The Baby on the Barge is a 1915 British silent film drama directed by Cecil Hepworth and starring Alma Taylor and Stewart Rome.  No print of the film is known to survive and it is presumed lost.

Plot
While her sailor husband is away, Nellie Jennis (Taylor) receives a visit from her brother Jack (Lionelle Howard), who is being sought by the police for an attack on another man.  Jack claims he is being wrongly accused as his actions were in self-defence, and Nellie agrees to shelter him for a while until he can make good his escape.  When her husband Bob (Rome) returns home, he finds evidence which Nellie has overlooked indicating that a man has been staying in his absence.  He assumes the worst and is consumed by jealous rage.  Nellie refuses to break Jack's confidence by telling Bob the truth, and becomes so fearful and distraught about Bob's treatment of her that she flees from home, taking their baby with her.

Nellie finds employment with Lord and Lady Lafene, who are happy to let her keep her baby with her.  Before long however, Lord Lafene starts trying to take advantage of her and she runs away again.  Now homeless, destitute and with no means to look after the baby, she returns home in secret and leaves the baby for Bob to care for.  Meanwhile, Jack's trouble with the police has been sorted out and he visits Bob, who now realises that he had suspected Nellie unfairly.  He and Bob go looking for Nellie and finally manage to track her down.  Nellie and Bob are reconciled.

Cast
 Alma Taylor as Nellie Jennis
 Stewart Rome as Bob Jennis
 Lionelle Howard as Jack Storm
 Edward Lingard as Lord Lafene
 Violet Hopson as Lady Lafene
 Henry Vibart as Doctor
 William Felton as Thief

External links 
 
 The Baby on the Barge at BFI Film & TV Database
 The Baby on the Barge at Silent Era

1915 films
1915 drama films
British silent short films
Films directed by Cecil Hepworth
British black-and-white films
Lost British films
British drama films
Hepworth Pictures films
1915 lost films
Lost drama films
1910s British films
Silent drama films